Värriö Strict Nature Reserve (Värriön luonnonpuisto) of Lapland, Finland, was established in 1981. Moving within the natural park happens under license. In the area there is a research station and the only way to go there is by trail. Field studies are carried out to investigate reindeer herding and predators, such as wolves and wolverines.

See also
 Värriö-pages, finnish

Strict nature reserves of Finland
Salla
Protected areas of the Arctic
Geography of Lapland (Finland)